Luis Rosado Robles (born December 6, 1955 in Santurce, Puerto Rico) is a retired Major League Baseball first baseman. He played during two seasons at the major league level for the New York Mets. He had been traded from the Orioles to the Tigers for Tom O'Malley on May 23, 1985.

References

External links
"Luis Rosado Statistics". The Baseball Cube. 24 January 2008.
"Luis Rosado Statistics". Baseball-Reference. 24 January 2008.

1955 births
Living people
New York Mets players
Major League Baseball first basemen
Major League Baseball players from Puerto Rico
Marion Mets players
Anderson Mets players
Visalia Mets players
Jackson Mets players
Tidewater Tides players
Syracuse Chiefs players
Hagerstown Suns players
Rochester Red Wings players
Birmingham Barons players
Nashville Sounds players